Ted 2 (stylized as ted2) is a 2015 American satirical comedy film directed by Seth MacFarlane and written by MacFarlane, Alec Sulkin, and Wellesley Wild. The second installment in the Ted franchise, it serves as a sequel to the 2012 film of the same name. The film follows the talking teddy bear Ted as he fights for his civil rights in order to be recognized as a person and not as property. The film stars Mark Wahlberg, Seth MacFarlane, Amanda Seyfried, Giovanni Ribisi, Jessica Barth, John Slattery, and Morgan Freeman.

Principal photography began in Massachusetts in July 2014. Ted 2 was released on June 26, 2015, by Universal Pictures. Despite the film failing to achieve the critical and commercial success of its predecessor and receiving mixed reviews from critics, it still became a box office success, grossing $215.9 million on a $68 million budget.

Plot 
Three years after the events of the first film, Ted marries his girlfriend, Tami-Lynn. Meanwhile, his best friend, John Bennett has been divorced from Lori Collins for six months. Following a heated argument after being married a year, they decide to have a child. As Ted cannot father a child, John agrees to help find a sperm donor. They ask Sam J. Jones but he declines due to a sperm count of one. Then they unsuccessfully try to break into Tom Brady's house and steal his sperm. Ultimately, John offers to donate his sperm.

Despite Ted and John's efforts, Tami-Lynn's history of drug use has rendered her infertile (despite having been clean for an extended period of time) and they decide to adopt. The background checks put Ted's legal status as a person into question. The state authorities of Massachusetts declare Ted property rather than a person; consequently, he loses his job at Bay Colony Grocery Store, his credit card and bank accounts are terminated and his marriage to Tami-Lynn is forcibly annulled.

John suggests that they take the state to court. They ask the best lawyer they can find, but he offers to assign their case pro bono to his niece Samantha "Sam" Jackson, a novice lawyer. They are initially reluctant due to her lack of pop culture knowledge, but bond over their love of marijuana as they prepare to present the case.

Meanwhile, Donny, Ted's life-long stalker, is a janitor at the headquarters of toy company Hasbro, in New York City. He convinces the company CEO to hire an expert attorney to ensure that Ted maintains his status as property, leaving him open to seizure by the firm to create more living teddy bears.

Despite Sam's best efforts, the court rules against Ted. Disheartened and desperate, the trio contact Patrick Meighan, a highly respected civil rights attorney, to help overturn the court's decision. Driving to Manhattan, the trio meet Meighan, who is sympathetic to Ted's plight but ultimately refuses the case, as he believes Ted has not significantly contributed to humanity due to his lifestyle.

Furious at the injustice and jealous of Sam and John's relationship, Ted takes his frustrations out on them and angrily storms off, wandering into the New York Comic-Con. However, Donny discreetly follows him. Once inside, Donny disguises himself as Raphael and tries to kidnap Ted, who runs off, takes refuge under a Bumblebee statue, and contacts John for help. John and Sam arrive and find Ted, just as Donny is about to cut him open. Ted apologizes to John and Sam for snapping at them and make their leave, but Donny severs the cables holding up a model of the USS Enterprise with a knife and it swings towards Ted. John pushes Ted out of the way, takes the hit, gets knocked unconscious, and falls into a coma. Ted identifies Donny from a group of Ninja Turtle cosplayers through his irresistible urge to dance to "I Think We're Alone Now" by Tiffany and Donny is arrested.

At the hospital, John is still in a coma, and he flatlines. The next day, the doctor informs Sam, Ted and Tami-Lynn that John "didn't make it", shocking the group. The doctor also suggests they can go in and say goodbye to John. In the room, the group is tearfully saying goodbye to John. However, he unexpectedly wakes up and scares the group, and Ted realizes that John had faked being dead as payback for Ted pretending to be mentally brain dead and Ted applauds John for his realistic acting. Although Sam is initially furious over this, she and John kiss as the group rejoices. Meighan decides to take the case, inspired by John's selflessness and Ted's emotions over John, who managed to avoid death. Meighan successfully gets the ruling overturned by demonstrating that Ted is self-aware, that he feels complex emotions, and is capable of empathy. Outside the courthouse, Ted re-proposes to Tami-Lynn. After they are legally remarried (though it's unknown if Ted ever got his job, credit card and bank accounts back), Ted and Tami-Lynn adopt the surname of "Clubber Lang", and adopt a baby boy, who they name Apollo Creed, while John and Sam happily pursue their own relationship.

Cast

 Seth MacFarlane as Ted Clubber-Lang 
 Mark Wahlberg as John Bennett
 Amanda Seyfried as Samantha Leslie Jackson
 Jessica Barth as Tami-Lynn McCafferty
 Giovanni Ribisi as Donny
 Morgan Freeman as Patrick Meighan
 John Slattery as Shep Wild
 Patrick Warburton as Guy
 Michael Dorn as Rick
 Bill Smitrovich as Frank
 Cocoa Brown as Joy
 John Carroll Lynch as Tom Jessup
 Ron Canada as Judge Matheson
 Jessica Szohr as Allison
 Jay Patterson as Karl Jackson
 Tara Strong as Ted's "I Love You" function
 Sam J. Jones as himself
 Sebastian Arcelus as Dr. Ed Danzer
 Maggie Geha as Female Nurse
 Tom Brady as himself
 Dennis Haysbert as Fertility doctor
 Taran Killam as himself
 Jimmy Fallon as himself
 Jimmy Kimmel as himself
 Jay Leno as himself
 Bill Maher as himself
 Kate McKinnon as herself
 Bobby Moynihan as himself
 David Hasselhoff as himself
 Liam Neeson as Trix Customer
 Lenny Clarke as Cop
 Patrick Stewart as Narrator
 Curtis Stigers as Wedding singer
 Nana Visitor as Adoption agent
 Ralph Garman as Stormtrooper
 Jack Knight as Todd Kidder

Production
During the 2012 American Dad! Comic-Con panel, MacFarlane stated that he would be open to a sequel to Ted. In September 2012, chief executive Steve Burke said that the studio would be looking to make a sequel to Ted "as soon as possible". In January 2013, on Anderson Live, Wahlberg confirmed that a sequel was in the works and that it would be the first sequel in his career, while also revealing that he and Ted (as voiced by MacFarlane) would appear at the 85th Academy Awards. On October 2, 2013, it was announced Ted 2 would be released on June 26, 2015.

Initially the storyline for the film was quite different and involved John and Ted's attempt to smuggle pot across the country, but, due to concerns that the concept was too similar to then-recently released We're the Millers, the concept was scrapped and the storyline was overhauled to one inspired by John Jakes' North and South series as well as the life of Dred Scott.
During the period when the film was about drug smuggling, Mila Kunis' character was still in the sequel; however, when the storyline was changed, it required a lawyer to be the female lead and there was not room for Kunis's character.

On February 14, 2014, Amanda Seyfried was cast as the female lead. On June 17, 2014, Jessica Barth was confirmed to reprise her role as Tami-Lynn. In August and September 2014, it was announced that Patrick Warburton would return as John's co-worker Guy, and that Morgan Freeman, Nana Visitor, Michael Dorn, Dennis Haysbert, Liam Neeson and John Slattery had joined the cast.

Principal photography began on July 28, 2014, and ended on November 13, 2014.

Soundtrack
The film's soundtrack was released by Republic Records on June 26, 2015. It features the score by Walter Murphy and songs co-written by Seth MacFarlane and Murphy, including "Mean Ol’ Moon", which is performed by Amanda Seyfried and Norah Jones separately. The soundtrack also includes "Mess Around" by Ray Charles, "One Foot in Front of the Other" by Bone Symphony and "New York" by Alfred Newman.

Track listing
All tracks by Walter Murphy except where indicated.

Release
On January 27, 2015, the film's teaser poster was released. This was followed two days later by its trailer. The film premiered on June 24, 2015, in New York City, with its general release two days later.

Home media
Ted 2 was released on DVD and Blu-ray on December 15, 2015, in the United States by Universal Studios Home Entertainment. Both formats contained a theatrical version (115 minutes) and an "unrated" extended version (125 minutes), containing 10 minutes of extra footage. It was released on DVD and Blu-ray in the United Kingdom and Ireland on November 23, 2015, both formats containing the two versions.

On May 3, 2016, Ted vs. Flash Gordon: The Ultimate Collection was released on Blu-ray plus Digital HD, featuring Flash Gordon and the unrated versions of Ted and Ted 2.

Reception

Box office
Ted 2 grossed $81.5 million in North America and $135.2 million in other territories for a worldwide total of $216.7 million, against a budget of $68 million.

In the United States and Canada, Ted 2 opened on the same day as the family adventure film Max, across 3,441 theaters. It made $2.6 million from its Thursday night showings from 2,647 theaters, and $13.2 million on its opening day.<ref>{{cite web|url=https://www.boxofficemojo.com/news/?id=4074|title='Jurassic' and 'Inside' Adjust 'Teds Weekend|author=Keith Simanton|work=Box Office Mojo|date=June 25, 2015|access-date=June 28, 2015}}</ref> In its opening weekend, Ted 2 earned $33.5 million, finishing third at the box office behind Jurassic World ($54.5 million) and Inside Out ($52.3 million). The opening total was a disappointment, considering the film's initial projected opening of $45–50 million, and its predecessor's $54.4 million opening three years prior. It was director MacFarlane's second consecutive underperforming opening, following 2014's A Million Ways to Die in the West, which opened to $16.8 million.

Outside North America, the film earned an estimated $20 million in its opening weekend from 26 countries. It opened in number two in Germany ($3.7 million), Russia and the CIS ($3.5 million) and Australia ($3.3 million).

Critical response
On Rotten Tomatoes, the film has an approval rating of 45% based on 206 reviews with an average rating of 5.28/10. The site's critical consensus reads, "Ted 2 reunites Mark Wahlberg and Seth MacFarlane for another round of sophomoric, scatological humor -- and just as before, your enjoyment will depend on your tolerance for all of the above." On Metacritic, the film has a score of 48 out of 100 based on 38 critics, indicating "mixed or average reviews". Audiences polled by CinemaScore gave the film an average grade of "B+" on an A+ to F scale, lower than the "A−" earned by its predecessor.

James Berardinelli of ReelViews gave the film two out of four stars, saying "It would be disingenuous for me to claim that Ted 2 isn't funny. Although I was often bored by the plodding direction of the story, I laughed from time-to-time." Chris Nashawaty of Entertainment Weekly gave the film a C+, saying "You realize what it must be like to be trapped in detention with a bunch of 15-year-old boys who think there's nothing more hilarious than repeating the same jokes about porn, pot, and pulling your pud over and over again. It's funny, until it's not." Bill Goodykoontz of The Arizona Republic gave the film two out of five stars, saying "The film, like most of MacFarlane's work, is a mix of occasional laugh-out-loud moments - there are some here - and cringe-worthy misfires that play a lot more tone-deaf than he seems to intend." Brian Truitt of USA Today gave the film two out of four stars, saying "MacFarlane and co-writers Alec Sulkin and Wellesley Wild have a gift for referential riffs, but the plot is the thinnest of narratives just to connect all the comedy bits." Stephen Whitty of the Newark Star-Ledger gave the film one and a half stars out of four, saying "Sure, MacFarlane can write simple jokes as long as the 'f' key on his laptop holds out. Some of them are even funny. But a lot of them don't pay off, and most trod the same well-worn territory -- potheads, practical jokes, politically incorrect cliches." Lindsey Bahr of the Associated Press gave the film a negative review, saying "In an admirable effort to go a different route, MacFarlane has instead done something hopelessly bizarre: He's given his film too much sincerity and story, and it practically crushes whatever fun does exist."

Mick LaSalle of the San Francisco Chronicle gave the film three out of four stars, saying "MacFarlane is cynical, but he's not a cynic, and there are moments in Ted 2 where you can sense a longing for the gentler and more upbeat entertainment of an earlier generation." Soren Anderson of The Seattle Times gave the film two out of four stars, saying "In the midst of comedy, seriousness. The combination feels forced. A more disciplined and smarter director might have been able to successfully blend the two elements, but crude dude MacFarlane hasn't the skill to bring it off." Dan Callahan of The Wrap gave the film a negative review, saying "Bad taste needs to be more honest and more all-inclusive if it's to make a lasting impression, and MacFarlane's bad taste here is both too wishy-washy and too knee-jerk cruel to really make any impact." Manohla Dargis of The New York Times gave the film a negative review, saying "Mr. MacFarlane can be funny, but Ted 2 is insultingly lazy hack work that is worth discussing primarily because of how he tries and fails to turn race, and specifically black men, into comedy fodder." Jacob Hall of New York Daily News gave the film one out of five stars, saying "Once again, you will believe that a talking CGI stuffed animal can be a racist, hateful monster with no redeeming qualities ... but his greatest sin is that he's not funny." Peter Howell of the Toronto Star gave the film two out of four stars, saying "If you didn't see and laugh at the first Ted, and maybe also at MacFarlane's button-pushing TV series Family Guy, then another movie deserves your entertainment dollars." A.A. Dowd of The A.V. Club gave the film a C+, saying "Ted 2 strikes a sometimes-awkward balance between sincerity and cheap provocation. It also forgets that the real draw of the first film wasn't Ted himself, but Wahlberg, whose sweet-lug routine scored a lot of belly laughs."

Accolades

 Future 
 Possible sequel 
In June 2015, Collider asked if the studio was already planning a third film, MacFarlane replied: "It's all based on appetite. If Ted 2 does as well as the first one, it means people want to see more of these characters. If that happens, then there would likely be a Ted 3. The franchise, to me, is one that's more character-based than premise-based. If you look at it like episodes in television, if you have characters that people like and they want to see them, again and again, you can tell any number of different stories. If there's a desire for it, then yeah, we would do a Ted 3."

On October 27, 2015, during an interview on Today MacFarlane, again, did not rule out the possibility of Ted 3, stating: "We don't know, I like to kind of have some space between Ted [films], so it's possible there will be another one but there are no immediate plans."

On September 13, 2021, MacFarlane posted an image to Instagram of the stuffed bear used in the Ted'' movies captioned "The original Ted stuffy mentally preparing for his return," hinting at the possibility of a sequel, although he might have been hinting at the then unannounced television series.

Television series 

In April 2022, it was announced that a prequel series was in development for the streaming service Peacock, with writers Paul Corrigan and Brad Walsh joining MacFarlane as the series' showrunners. MacFarlane is also set to reprise his role as the title character.

References

External links

 
 
 

2015 films
2015 comedy films
2015 fantasy films
2010s American films
2010s buddy comedy films
2010s English-language films
2010s legal films
2010s sex comedy films
American buddy comedy films
American courtroom films
American fantasy comedy films
American legal films
American sequel films
American sex comedy films
American satirical films
Fictional teddy bears
Films about bears
Films about drugs
Films about human rights
Films about lawyers
Films about sentient toys
Films directed by Seth MacFarlane
Films produced by Seth MacFarlane
Films produced by Scott Stuber
Films scored by Walter Murphy
Films set in Boston
Films set in New York City
Films shot in Boston
Films shot in New York City
Films using motion capture
Films with screenplays by Seth MacFarlane
Fuzzy Door Productions films
Magic realism films
Media Rights Capital films
Ted (franchise)
Universal Pictures films